Joe Baldacci (born February 21, 1965) is an American attorney and Democratic politician from Maine. Baldacci serves in the Maine Senate representing District 9, serving Bangor and Hermon. He grew up in Bangor and attended the University of Maine and the University of Maine School of Law. Following law school, Baldacci returned to Bangor and opened a law practice, serving on the Bangor City Council beginning in 1996. Baldacci served 12 years on the Council, including two terms as chair/mayor, before being elected to the Maine Senate in 2020. He also made a brief run for Maine's 2nd congressional district seat in 2016 but dropped out before the Democratic primary in June.

Early life and education
Baldacci was born in Bangor and grew up there working in his family's restaurant, Momma Baldacci's, with his seven siblings. His father served on the Bangor City Council. Baldacci attended the University of Maine and graduated in 1987 with a Bachelor of Arts in political science, continuing to the University of Maine School of Law, where he completed his Juris Doctor in 1991. While at Maine Law, Baldacci co-founded the Maine Association for Public Interest Law (MAPIL) to help provide scholarships for law students pursuing public interest law opportunities, an organization that is still granting scholarships today.

Law career & political office

Following law school, Baldacci returned to Bangor and started a law practice. He was first elected to the Bangor City Council in 1996 and re-elected in 1999, also serving a term as City Council chairman and Mayor—in Bangor, these two titles belong to one position—and remaining on the council until 2002.

Baldacci was elected to the City Council again in 2011 in a race that also unseated two incumbents, and was re-elected in 2014.

In July 2015, Baldacci announced that he would run for the Democratic nomination for Maine's 2nd congressional district, challenging incumbent Republican Bruce Poliquin. He dropped out in February 2016 and endorsed fellow Democrat Emily Cain for the nomination. Baldacci was again elected City Council chairman and mayor of Bangor in November 2016. 

In a 2021 interview, Baldacci  recalls deciding during his final term as City Councilor that he would run for the Maine Senate. He explained that his experiences navigating and becoming familiar with local policies over his 12 years on the council had helped him feel prepared for the position, and that his daughters were in college by then, making the increased time commitment more feasible for his family.

In 2020, Baldacci ran for the Maine Senate District 9 seat vacated by term-limited incumbent Geoffrey Gratwick. In the Democratic primary, he defeated Victoria Kornfield 53%-47%, and in the November general election he received 55% of the vote in the three-way race with Republican Sean Hinkley and independent Kristie Miner. Since his 2020 term began, Baldacci has served on the Health and Human Services committee and is the chair of State and Local Government committee.

Personal life
Baldacci lives in Bangor with his wife Elizabeth, who is also an attorney. The couple has two adult daughters. Baldacci and his brother John Baldacci, a former U.S. Congressman and governor, frequently hold spaghetti dinners to support local needs and causes. The dinners feature Mamma Baldacci's secret spaghetti sauce recipe.

Electoral record

References

External links
Maine Senate Democrats: Joe Baldacci
Sen Joseph Baldacci (D-Penobscot): Maine State Legislature
Joe Baldacci on Facebook
Joe Baldacci on Twitter
City Council Chronicles Interview #14: Bangor, ME Councilor Joe Baldacci
Beacon podcast: Congressional candidate Joe Baldacci on the issues, September 2015

1965 births
Living people
Maine lawyers
Bangor City Council members
Democratic Party Maine state senators
University of Maine alumni
University of Maine School of Law alumni